Xanthaciura chrysura is a species of tephritid or fruit flies in the genus Xanthaciura of the family Tephritidae.

Distribution
United States, Mexico, South to Argentina, Brazil.

References

Tephritinae
Insects described in 1869
Diptera of South America